Fatemeh Alia is an Iranian conservative politician and former member of the Parliament of Iran representing Tehran, Rey, Shemiranat and Eslamshahr.

In 2009, Mahmoud Ahmadinejad nominated her for Ministry of Education, but she did not receive enough votes from Parliament to take office.

References

1956 births
Living people
Members of the 7th Islamic Consultative Assembly
Members of the 8th Islamic Consultative Assembly
Members of the 9th Islamic Consultative Assembly
Deputies of Tehran, Rey, Shemiranat and Eslamshahr
Alliance of Builders of Islamic Iran politicians
Front of Islamic Revolution Stability politicians
Coalition of the Pleasant Scent of Servitude politicians
Zeynab Society politicians
Members of the Women's fraction of Islamic Consultative Assembly
Society of Devotees of the Islamic Revolution politicians
21st-century Iranian women politicians
21st-century Iranian politicians
Politicians from Tehran